Philippines–South Sudan relations refers to the bilateral relationship between the Philippines and South Sudan. The Philippines recognized South Sudan as a sovereign state nearly a month after it declared its independence on 9 July 2011. The Philippine embassy in Nairobi has jurisdiction over South Sudan since March 2013. This was held previously by Philippine embassy in Cairo.

History
The Philippines officially recognized South Sudan as a sovereign and independent state soon after South Sudan declared its independence on July 9, 2011. The Philippines and South Sudan established diplomatic relations through a Joint Communiqué signed by Philippine and South Sudanese ambassadors to Kenya, Domingo Lucenario Jr. and Majok Guandong Thiep at the United Nations Office at Nairobi on 13 March 2013. In a statement, Lucenario said the formal establishment of relations between the Philippines and South Sudan will be mutually beneficial "because [the two countries] would now be able to intensify relations in various common areas of cooperation.” The two ambassadors also discussed the need to establish a Joint Commission on Bilateral Cooperation to identify various areas of cooperation to benefit the peoples of the Philippines and South Sudan.

On April 13, 2016, President Salva Kiir Mayardit of South Sudan accepted the credentials of Philippine Ambassador Bayani V. Mangibin.

Other economic relations
There are more than 300 Overseas Filipinos working in South Sudan. On 13 January 2012, the Philippine Overseas Employment Administration banned the deployment of Filipino workers to South Sudan due to the escalation of inter-ethnic violence in the country's Jonglei State. The ban was lifted two months later (on 22 March 2012) as the political and security situation in South Sudan improved.

On 24 December 2013, the Philippine Overseas Employment Administration reinstated the ban on deployment of Filipino workers to South Sudan at the outbreak of the South Sudanese Civil War. On 21 October 2015, the Philippine Overseas Employment Administration partially lifted of the deployment ban upon the recommendations of the Department of Foreign Affairs to allow Filipinos personnel of international organizations to return to South Sudan on the condition that employers will assume responsibility for the evacuation of Filipino workers. The approval was specifically granted to Dai Nippon Construction for deployment solely to Japanese International Cooperation Agency (JICA)-funded projects of the Nile River Bridge and implementation of Water Supply System. On 24 January 2016, the same approval was granted to Pacific Architects and Engineers Incorporated under its contract with the US State Department in South Sudan for its Flight Ops Support Program.

On 30 June 2016, in view of the formation of the Transitional Government of National Unity and improving situation, the Philippine Overseas Employment Administration allowed redeployment of returning Filipino workers to South Sudan, subject to proof of existing employment.

See also
Foreign relations of the Philippines
Foreign relations of South Sudan

References

 
South Sudan
Bilateral relations of South Sudan